Peter James Brown (born Peter James Rogan; October 28, 1963) is a retired United States Coast Guard rear admiral, who served as the Special Representative for Puerto Rico's Disaster Recovery. He previously served as the tenth Homeland Security Advisor in the Trump Administration.

Early life and education 
Brown was born in New York City and raised in Somers, New York. He earned a Bachelor of Science degree in Chemistry from the United States Coast Guard Academy in May 1985, followed by a Master of Science in Chemistry from the University of Miami in May 1991 and a Juris Doctor from the University of Connecticut School of Law in May 1995.

Career 
Prior to serving in the United States Department of Homeland Security, Brown was a commander of the Coast Guard's Seventh District in Miami.

In September 2019, Brown was active in advising President Trump during Hurricane Dorian, accompanying him to Camp David to provide status updates during the storm. During the Hurricane Dorian–Alabama controversy, Brown defended Trump in several statements, stating that he had briefed the president on models in which Dorian would make landfall in Alabama.

On February 7, 2020, it was announced that Brown would become Trump's Special Representative for Puerto Rico's Disaster Recovery, coordinating Puerto Rico’s continuing recovery efforts from Hurricane Maria and the recent 2020 Puerto Rico earthquakes.

Post-retirement 

After retirement, Brown endorsed Gino Campana in the 2022 United States Senate election in Colorado.

References 

1963 births
Living people
People from Somers, New York
United States Coast Guard Academy alumni
Military personnel from New York City
University of Miami alumni
University of Connecticut School of Law alumni
United States Coast Guard admirals
United States presidential advisors
Trump administration personnel